Stetson University

Shawn Finney (born September 20, 1962) is an American college basketball coach who is currently an assistant coach at Stetson University. He was the head coach at Tulane from 2000 to 2005, compiling a 60–86 record. He was fired on March 13, 2005.

Finney was an assistant at UCF from 2010 to 2016, helping the team to a pair of postseason appearances and three 20-win seasons. Between 2016 and 2018 Finney served as an assistant at Manhattan under Steve Masiello. In June 2018, Finney was hired at Samford as an assistant under Scott Padgett. In 2021, he was hired at Stetson as an assistant under Donnie Jones.

References

External links
Coaching record @ sports-reference.com
Samford Bulldogs coaching bio
Manhattan Jaspers bio

1962 births
Living people
American men's basketball coaches
American men's basketball players
Basketball coaches from West Virginia
Basketball players from West Virginia
College men's basketball head coaches in the United States
Fairmont State Fighting Falcons men's basketball players
Georgia Bulldogs basketball coaches
Junior college men's basketball coaches in the United States
Kentucky Wildcats men's basketball coaches
Manhattan Jaspers basketball coaches
Marshall Thundering Herd men's basketball coaches
Pikeville Bears men's basketball coaches
Randolph–Macon Yellow Jackets men's basketball coaches
Samford Bulldogs men's basketball coaches
Tulane Green Wave men's basketball coaches
Tulsa Golden Hurricane men's basketball coaches
UCF Knights men's basketball coaches
University of Tulsa alumni